The Land Rover Burghley Horse Trials is an annual three-day event held at Burghley House near Stamford, Lincolnshire, England, currently in early September. Land Rover Burghley Horse Trials is classified by the FEI as one of the six leading three-day events in the world (the others being the Badminton Horse Trials, the Kentucky Three-Day Event, the Australian International Three Day Event, the Luhmühlen Horse Trials and the Étoiles de Pau). It has competition at CCI5*-L  (five star) level. The prize for first place is currently £95,000. Prize money is given down to 20th place.

Burghley is also one of the three events in the Grand Slam of Eventing.

Run in conjunction with the event since 1990 is the Burghley Young Event Horse final, which judges 4 and 5 year old horses on their potential as future Olympic mounts.

History
Horse trials have been held at Burghley House since 1961 when its owner the 6th Marquess of Exeter, an Olympic gold medalist in athletics and IOC member, heard that a three-day event at Harewood House could no longer be held. Since then no other international horse trials site has staged as many championships, a record ten in all including the first World Championship in 1966.

It is the longest continuous running international event. Up to 2018 there have been six course designers: Bill Thomson, M.R.C.V.S. 1961 – 1983, Lt-Col. Henry Nicoll, D.S.O., O.B.E., 1975, Philip Herbert 1984 – 1988, Captain Mark Phillips, C.V.O., 1989 – 1996 and 1998 – 2000, Mike Tucker 1997 and 2001, Wolfgang Feld 2002 – 2004 and Capt. Mark Phillips, C.V.O., 2005 -.

Winners

External links
 Burghley Horse Trials official site

Equestrian sports in England
Equestrian sports in the United Kingdom
Eventing
Sport in Stamford, Lincolnshire